The chapel of Notre-Dame des Marches is a Roman Catholic chapel and pilgrimage site in the commune of Broc, canton of Fribourg, Switzerland. It was listed as a heritage site of national significance.

History
The name Marches derives from the word marais (marsh). The current chapel dates back from 1705. It was founded by friars Jean-Jacques, Nicolas et François Ruffieux, three local churchmen. 

The chapel of Notre-Dame des Marches gained popularity in Switzerland thanks to two miraculous healings in the 1880s. In September 1892, a temperance pilgrimage was organised there. The pilgrimage still exists today but is less popular than in the beginning. In 1945, because of the war, the sick people were not able to travel to Lourdes, so the pilgrimage of the sick was organised at Notre-Dame des Marches. In the 1970s, the number of visitors started declining. After large gatherings and special train travels in the previous centuries, the pilgrims of the 21st century usually get to the chapel by tripping individually. However, attendance at religious services is quite high. Every year, the chapel receives two pilgrimages: the one of the sick in May, and the Autumn pilgrimage in September. The pilgrims are welcomed by L’Œuvre des malades, made of 50 volunteers. 

Abbot Joseph Bovet composed a chant in Fribourgeois dialect named Nouthra Dona di Maortsè, translated into French as Notre-Dame des Marches.

The chapel of Notre-Dame des Marches was listed among the Cultural Property of National Significance.

See also
List of cultural property of national significance in Switzerland: Fribourg

References

Bibliography

External links
Official website 

Roman Catholic chapels in Switzerland
Roman Catholic shrines in Switzerland
Roman Catholic churches completed in 1705
18th-century establishments in Switzerland
Cultural property of national significance in the canton of Fribourg
18th-century Roman Catholic church buildings in Switzerland